Elisabeth Subrin is a Brooklyn-based filmmaker, screenwriter, and visual artist. She is known for her interdisciplinary practice in the contemporary art and independent film worlds. She is a professor in Temple University's Department of Film and Media Arts. Her feature length narrative film A Woman, a Part; starring Maggie Siff, Cara Seymour, John Ortiz, and Khandi Alexander; premiered at The Rotterdam Film Festival in 2016. She is also the creator of the blog, Who Cares About Actresses, dedicated to actress Maria Schneider.

Biography
Subrin grew up in Boston, Massachusetts. She received her M.F.A. from The School of the Art Institute of Chicago in 1995. In 2001 she received the Creative Capital Award in the discipline of Moving Image. In 2003 she was selected for the Sundance Institute's Feature Film Directing and Screenwriting Labs with her first feature screenplay, "Up". Her debut narrative feature film A Woman, A Part, premiered at The Rotterdam Film Festival in 2016.

Film and video work 

Swallow (1995)
"Swallow" is an experimental video exploring early adolescence and eating disorders. Tina Wasserman wrote in The New Art Examiner (1996) that, "For Subrin, as the visual metaphor of silence or speechlessness---evidenced primarily by the repeated use of white-out on the body, text, and image---gains prominence in Swallow, it becomes clear that the fragility of female identity in post-feminist America appears, in part, as the failure of language itself."

Shulie (1997)
Subrin's best known work was inspired by her rediscovery of a little-seen documentary profiling Shulamith Firestone in her final year as a B.F.A. student at School of the Art Institute of Chicago. The original 1967 film was part of a larger series made by four male graduate students at Northwestern University  and documents Firestone three years before she published The Dialectic of Sex: The Case for Feminist Revolution and became recognized as a key figure in the development of radical feminism. Filmed on Super-8 and transferred to video and back to 16mm, Subrin's piece is a shot-by-shot remake of the 1967 documentary with Kim Soss playing Firestone. On the occasion of her 2015 solo show at Lincoln Center's "Art of the Real" series, Richard Brody wrote in The New Yorker about the film, praising its ingenuity of form.

Kate Haug wrote in a review of the film, "Given the late ‘80s art world trends of appropriation and the ever-growing experience of simulacrum, it is not so shocking that an innovative filmmaker would take on celluloid cloning" and continued to state that "by creating a replica film of the ‘60s she [Subrin] harnesses the remake's amorphous quality of time to deftly address contemporary politics." This film forces its viewers to reconnect to and become re-aware of the historical context – the individual and radical origins of U.S. feminism's Second Wave and how that course of events was subsumed and re-defined by the ensuing conservative political culture of the ‘80s. Haug continues, "The temporal gap between 1967 and 1997 grants the audience a chance to re-think the future of feminism. By not completing or adding to Firestone's biography, Subrin intentionally leaves the history of feminism incomplete – instead of following Firestone as she matures, Shulie (1967 and 1997) stops before feminism takes off."

B. Ruby Rich, author of the book Chick Flicks noted, "She has created a document within a document that makes us remember what we didn’t know, [and] makes us realize all over again how much we’ve lost."

The Fancy (2000)
The Fancy, is an experimental biography exploring the life, death, and legacy of the late photographer Francesca Woodman, who committed suicide at age 22. The film explores the young artist's lasting legacy by meditating on her absence. A.O.Scott, "Video Art in a World on Tape," The New York Times.

The Caretakers (2006)
A commission for The MacDowell Colony's Centennial Celebration, "The Caretakers" traces the unraveling of a writer as she begins a residency at the artist colony, haunted by the aura of former artists who worked there.
Featuring Cara Seymour (Adaptation, Dancer in the Dark, American Psycho), with an original score by video/performance artist Wynne Greenwood (Tracy and the Plastics).

Sweet Ruin (2008) 
"Sweet Ruin" is an experimental adaptation starring Gaby Hoffmann of Michelangelo Antonioni's script, Technically Sweet, written in the late '60s, but never produced. Set in the Amazon and Sardinia, Technically Sweet was to star Jack Nicholson as T., a disillusioned journalist obsessed with guns, and Maria Schneider as "The Girl."

Lost Tribes and Promised Lands (2010) 
A split screen projection created in response to the after-effects of the 9/11 attacks. Shot on 16mm, the footage documents memorials set up around Subrin's neighborhood immediately following the attacks, and revisits the same locations eight years later. Nick Stillman, Artforum 2010. Following the installation, Subrin was featured on The New York Times homepage in an interview about the work.

A Woman, a Part (2016)
A full-length feature film, written and directed by Subrin, starring Maggie Siff, Cara Seymour, and John Ortiz.

Lectures and academic career  

Subrin has taught at Harvard University, Yale University School of Art, Cooper Union, Amherst College, Bennington College, and The School of the Art Institute of Chicago. She is currently an Associate Professor in the Film and Media Arts Department at Temple University and lives in Brooklyn, New York.
 
She has led panel discussions with feminist icons such as filmmaker, Agnès Varda, legal scholar and activist, Anita Hill and fellow feminist artists such as K8 Hardy and Johanna Fateman.

Other work  

Subrin has worked in collaboration with many artists and producers, such as on Crisis in Woodlawn (1994). Other projects include The Judy Spots (1995) five television spots produced with Sadie Benning for MTV, and The File Room (1994), an interactive electronic archives produced by Antonio Muntadas. In 2002 she directed the music video well, well, well for New York-based feminist electronic band Le Tigre and worked as a creative consultant and videographer for the historical documentary Slumming It: Myth and Culture on the Bowery (2002), directed by Scott Elliott.

She is an associate producer on David Shapiro's 2015 documentary "Missing People," and the creator and editor of the feminist blog, "Who Cares About Actresses."

Notes

References 
Haug, Kate (Nov/Dec, 1998). "Shulie. – Review – video recording reviews", Afterimage.
Creative Capital (2001): Project Page | UP - Essay "Elisabeth Subrin: Up" (essay), Creative Capital.
Firestone, Shulamith (1970). "The Dialectic of Sex: The Case for Feminist Revolution", New York: William Morrow and Co.
Rich, B. Ruby (1998). Chick Flicks: Theories and Memories of the Feminist Film Movement, Durham, North Carolina: Duke University Press.
Armour, Nicole (Nov/Dec 2000). "Disappearing Acts", Film Comment 36:6.
Jensen, Jytte (Winter, 2006). "The Colony Gets Its Close-Up", MacDowell, Vol.35, No.2: p. 5.
Freeman, Elizabeth (2000). "Packing History, Count(er)ing Generations", New Literary History 31:727-744.
Liehm, Mira (1986). "Passion and Defiance: Italian Film from 1942 to the Present", University of California Press: 230.

External links
 Shulie: Film and Stills by Elisabeth Subrin

Massachusetts College of Art and Design alumni
Harvard University faculty
Amherst College faculty
Living people
People from Brooklyn
American women video artists
American video artists
Year of birth missing (living people)
American women academics
21st-century American women